Jan Zimmermann (born 12 February 1993) is a German professional volleyball player. He is a member of the Germany national team. At the professional club level, he plays for Vero Volley Monza.

Honours

Clubs
 National championships
 2013/2014  German Cup, with VfB Friedrichshafen
 2014/2015  German Championship, with VfB Friedrichshafen
 2014/2015  German Cup, with VfB Friedrichshafen
 2018/2019  Belgian Championship, with Greenyard Maaseik
 2020/2021  Italian SuperCup, with Sir Safety Perugia

References

External links
  
 Player profile at LegaVolley.it 
 Player profile at PlusLiga.pl  
 Player profile at Volleybox.net

1993 births
Living people
Sportspeople from Tübingen
German men's volleyball players
European Games medalists in volleyball
European Games gold medalists for Germany
Volleyball players at the 2015 European Games
German expatriate sportspeople in France
Expatriate volleyball players in France
German expatriate sportspeople in Belgium
Expatriate volleyball players in Belgium
German expatriate sportspeople in Italy
Expatriate volleyball players in Italy
German expatriate sportspeople in Poland
Expatriate volleyball players in Poland
BBTS Bielsko-Biała players
Setters (volleyball)